Kokopelli is a fertility deity, usually depicted as a humpbacked flute player (often with feathers or antenna-like protrusions on his head), who is venerated by some Native American cultures in the Southwestern United States. Like most fertility deities, Kokopelli presides over both childbirth and agriculture. He is also a trickster god and represents the spirit of music.

Myths

Among the Hopi, Kokopelli carries unborn children on his back and distributes them to women; for this reason, young girls often fear him. He often takes part in rituals relating to marriage, and Kokopelli himself is sometimes depicted with a consort, a woman called Kokopelmimi by the Hopi. It is said that Kokopelli can be seen on the full and waning moon, much like the "man" or the "rabbit" on the moon."

Kokopelli also presides over the reproduction of game animals, and for this reason, he is often depicted with animal companions such as rams and deer. Other common creatures associated with him include sun-bathing animals such as snakes, or water-loving animals like lizards and insects.

In his domain over agriculture, Kokopelli's flute-playing chases away the winter and brings about spring. Many tribes, such as the Zuni, also associate Kokopelli with the rains. He frequently appears with Paiyatamu, another flutist, in depictions of maize-grinding ceremonies. Some tribes say he carries seeds and babies on his back.

In recent years, the emasculated (i.e. non-ithyphallic) version of Kokopelli has been adopted as a broader symbol of the Southwestern United States as a whole. His image adorns countless items such as T-shirts, ball caps, key-chains, and patio decor. He is also noticeable on the wall by the swimming pool on the home of Walter White (Bryan Cranston) in several episodes of Breaking Bad. A bicycle trail between Grand Junction, Colorado, and Moab, Utah, is now known as the Kokopelli Trail.

Origins and development

Kokopelli has been revered since at least the time of the Hohokam, Yuman, and Ancestral Puebloan peoples. The first known images of him appear on Hohokam pottery dated to sometime between 750 and 850 AD.

Kokopelli may have originally been a representation of Aztec traders, known as pochtecas, who may have traveled to this region from northern Mesoamerica. These traders brought their goods in sacks slung across their backs and this sack may have evolved into Kokopelli's familiar hump; some tribes consider Kokopelli to have been a trader. These men may also have used flutes to announce themselves as friendly as they approached a settlement. This origin is still in doubt, however, since the first known images of Kokopelli predate the major era of Mesoamerican-Ancestral Pueblo peoples trade by several hundred years, as well as the Aztec Empire and its pochtecas.

Many believe that Kokopelli was more than a trader, and more significantly, an important conveyor of information and trinkets from afar. As a storyteller par excellence, Kokopelli had the gift of languages, with a formidable repertoire of body-language storytelling skills to complement his many talents. Kokopelli's usual noisy announcement upon arrival secured both the identity, and therefore the safety, of his unique presence into a community. Often accompanied by an apprentice in his travels and trade, Kokopelli was important in linking distant and diverse communities together. In the South American Andes, the 'Ekeko' character functioned in much the same way. Upon arrival, his banging and clanging of his wares dangling all about his person signaled to all that a night of entertainment and trade of his goods and talismans was at hand.

Even today, occasional outside visitors may be called or referred to as 'Kokopelli' when they bring news, stories, and trinkets from the outside world to share with the little pueblos or villages.

Another theory is that Kokopelli is actually an anthropomorphic insect. Many of the earliest depictions of Kokopelli make him very insect-like in appearance. The name "Kokopelli" may be a combination of "Koko", another Hopi and Zuni deity, and "pelli", the Hopi and Zuni word for the desert robber fly, an insect with a prominent proboscis and a rounded back, which is also noted for its zealous sexual proclivities. A more recent etymology is that Kokopelli means literally "kachina hump". Because the Hopi were the tribe from whom the Spanish explorers first learned of the god, their name is the one most commonly used.

Kokopelli is one of the most easily recognized figures found in the petroglyphs and pictographs of the Southwest. The earliest known petroglyph of the figure dates to about 1000 AD. The Spanish missionaries in the area convinced the Hopi craftsmen to usually omit the phallus from their representations of the figure. As with most kachinas, the Hopi Kokopelli was often represented by a human dancer. 

A similar humpbacked figure is found in artifacts of the Mississippian culture of the United States southeast. Between approximately 1200 to 1400 AD, water vessels were crafted in the shape of a humpbacked woman.  These forms may represent a cultural heroine or founding ancestor, and may also reflect concepts related to the life-giving blessings of water and fertility.

Other names

Kokopele
Kokopilli
Kokopilau
Neopkwai'i (Pueblo)
Ololowishkya (Zuni)
La Kokopel

See also
 Anasazi flute
 Cañon Pintado
 Rock art
 Blythe Intaglios

References
Notes

Bibliography
 Slifer, Dennis, and Duffield, James (1994). Kokopelli: Flute Player Images in Rock Art. Santa Fe, New Mexico: Ancient City Press.
 Young, John V. (1990). Kokopelli: Casanova of the Cliff Dwellers: The Hunchbacked Flute Player. Palmer Lake, Colorado: Filter Press. .
 Schuler, Linda Lay. She, who remembers.

Further reading
 Malotki, Ekkehart. Kokopelli: The Making of an Icon. (Univ. of Nebraska Pr., 2000).  (hardcover),  (paper).
 Martineau, LaVan, The Rocks Begin to  Speak, KC Publications, Las Vegas, Nevada,  2003
 McLeod, David My Hand Tatoo, American Educator, (Jan-Feb, 1992): Right Hand
 Michael Castro, The Kokopilau Cycle" Homage to the Hopi, poetry, The Blue Cloud Quarterly, Marvin, South Dakota, 1975
 Patteson, Alex, A Field Guide to Rock Art Symbols of the Greater Southwest, Johnson Books, Boulder, Colorado,  1992
 Schaafsma, Polly, Rock Art in New Mexico, Museum of New Mexico Press, Santa Fe, New Mexico,  1992
 Slifer, Dennis, Kokopelli: The Magic, Mirth, and Mischief of an Ancient Symbol, Gibbs M. Smith Inc, 2007. .
 Slifer, Dennis, The Serpent and the Sacred Fire; Fertility Images in Southwest Rock Art, Museum of New Mexico Press, Santa Fe, New Mexico,  2000
 Slifer, Dennis, Signs of Life: Rock art in the Upper Rio Grande, Ancient City Press, Santa Fe, New Mexico,  1998

External links

Gods of the indigenous peoples of North America
Fertility gods
Lunar gods
Trickster gods
Agricultural gods
Arts gods
Hopi mythology
Zuni mythology
Harvest gods